The official name of Quebec City is Québec (with an acute accent), in both official languages of Canada (Canadian English and Canadian French alike). This name is used by both the federal and provincial governments. The acute accent differentiates between the official English name of the city named Québec, and the constitutional English name of the province named Quebec, spelled without any diacritics.

Etymology

Distinction with the province
In unofficial English texts, the accent is often dropped and Québec is informally referred to as "Quebec City". 
In French, names of geographical regions such as provinces and countries are typically preceded by articles whereas city names are not (unless it is part of the name, such as "La Malbaie"). As a result, the province is called  ("in Quebec" = , "from Quebec" or "of Quebec" = ) while the city remains simply  ("in Québec City" = , "from / of Quebec City" = ). Where context requires further differentiation, words such as "" and "" can be used (taking care not to capitalize the word "").

Other names
This naming convention applies to all municipal corporations in the province (e.g.  is the corporate body governing Montréal, etc.) Thus, where "" is capitalized, it means the corporate body and it is not part of the toponym (Montréal, Québec), but is the incorporated name of the city. In the English section of 's official website, the city is variously referred to as "Québec" and "Québec City" (with an accent) whereas the corporate body is referred to as "City of Québec".

Quebec City is sometimes referred to as "" ("the national capital"). The government officially named it this way under the  party. The provincial administrative region where the city is situated bears the name  (capitalized). The word  is the adjective for the noun  used in its normal basic sense and refers to Quebec as a nation within the country of Canada, and has no indication of sovereignty.

Demonyms
To avoid confusion with  meaning an inhabitant of the province, the term  for residents of the city is sometimes used. In English, the terms Quebecer (or Quebecker) and Québécois/e are common.

See also
History of Quebec City
, the Royal Canadian Navy warship whose full name is a title, and is capitalized.

References

History of Quebec City
Quebec City
French language in Quebec